Božena Srncová, née Krejcarová (11 June 1925 in Prague – 30 November 1997 in Semily) was a Czech gymnast who competed in the 1948 Summer Olympics winning gold in the team event, and in the 1952 Summer Olympics receiving a bronze medal in the team event.

References

External links 
 

1925 births
1997 deaths
Czech female artistic gymnasts
Olympic gymnasts of Czechoslovakia
Gymnasts at the 1948 Summer Olympics
Gymnasts at the 1952 Summer Olympics
Olympic gold medalists for Czechoslovakia
Olympic bronze medalists for Czechoslovakia
Olympic medalists in gymnastics
Medalists at the 1952 Summer Olympics
Medalists at the 1948 Summer Olympics
Gymnasts from Prague